Patricia Rétiz Gutiérrez (born March 17, 1971 in Mexico City) is a Mexican marathon runner. She set a personal best time of 2:30:29, by winning the 2008 LALA Marathon in Torreón, Coahuila.

At age thirty-seven, Retiz made her official debut for the 2008 Summer Olympics in Beijing, where she competed in the women's marathon, along with her teammates Karina and Madai Pérez. She successfully finished the race in fifty-fifth place by five seconds behind Spain's Alessandra Aguilar, with a time of 2:39:34.

References

External links

NBC 2008 Olympics profile

Mexican female marathon runners
Living people
Olympic athletes of Mexico
Athletes (track and field) at the 2008 Summer Olympics
Athletes from Mexico City
1971 births